The McGilvray Medal is an annual award given by ABC Radio to a player chosen by the commentators. It is awarded at the beginning of the calendar year to honour the player's achievements of the preceding year in Test cricket. It is sometimes referred to as the ABC Test Cricketer of the Year. Awarded since 1997, the medal is named for Alan McGilvray, a former cricketer and long-serving veteran cricket commentator, and is usually presented by his surviving family members. Prior to the 2002 Year Award, it was awarded annually to honour four leading Australian players, the best domestic performer and Australia's top female cricketer.

Winners

References

Cricket awards and rankings
Australian sports trophies and awards